The Imperial Natural History Museum or Imperial-Royal Natural History Court Museum of Austria-Hungary was created by (Kaiser) Emperor Franz Joseph I during an extensive reorganization of the museum collections, from 1851 to 1876, and opened to the public on August 10, 1889.  Located in Vienna, the Museum was named in German as "K.k. Naturhistorisches Hofmuseum" (with "Hofmuseum" translated as "Court Museum").

Later, the Museum became part of the Natural History Museum of Vienna, Austria (in German, "Naturhistorisches Museum Wien" or NHM-Wien).

When officially begun in 1876, Austrian geologist Ferdinand von Hochstetter (1829–1884) became the first superintendent of the Imperial Natural History Museum, after having been, from 1860, professor of mineralogy and geology at the Imperial-Royal Polytechnic Institute in Vienna. In 1886, Austrian geologist and paleontologist Franz Ritter von Hauer became second superintendent of the Imperial Natural History Museum (more at "History" below).

The main building for the Museum was constructed between 1871 and 1891.

See more about the current museum at: Naturhistorisches Museum.

History
In the mid-19th century, there was much interest in the natural sciences, and the encouragement of this interest was a concern of the young sovereign, Franz Josef I: The newly built museum was inscribed: "Dem Reiche der Natur und seiner Erforschung —Kaiser FRANZ JOSEF I" ("To the realm of nature and its exploration —Emperor FRANZ JOSEPH I"). The new Imperial-Royal Natural History Court Museum thus documented the benevolent sentiment of the Imperial Household. Excavations for the construction of the new Museum of Nature started in the fall of 1871, and construction was completed more than ten years later.

On April 29, 1876, Emperor Franz Joseph I signed the document certifying the Natural History Court Museum, and Ferdinand von Hochstetter was appointed as the managing director of the museum. Hochstetter proposed a new organization for the museum and its collections. Four departments having far-reaching autonomy were created as successors to the older Cabinets; the Imperial-Royal Mineralogical Court Cabinet was divided in an Imperial-Royal Mineralogical-Petrographical Department and an Imperial-Royal Geologic-Paleontologic Department. The petrologist and meteorite specialist Aristides Brezina became director of the former and was supported by scientific colleagues: Friedrich Berwerth, with Felix Karrer and Rudolf Koechlin providing voluntary unpaid services. Felix Karrer became Secretary of the Wissenschaftlicher Club (Science Club) and founder of the Mineralogy collection of the department. By 1886, Rudolf Köchlin became scientific assistant and, later, maintained an inventory of the collection and even kept a diary.

Hochstetter died on July 18, 1884, and did not live to see the completion of the building for whose founding he had been so actively engaged. His successor as superintendent was Franz Ritter von Hauer, a geologist and paleontologist.

In the presence of the Emperor, the new "K.k. Naturhistorisches Hofmuseum" (Imperial-Royal Natural History Court Museum) was inaugurated on August 10, 1889. Initially, it was open to visitors four days per week—free on Thursdays, Saturdays and Sundays, on Tuesdays for an admission price of one florin. The museum building and the collection it contained were highly popular: from August 13, 1889, to the end of December 1889 the museum counted 175,000 visitors, of which most (134,000) visited the museum during the 19 Sundays over this time span alone.

During 1889, the "Mineralogisch-Petrographische Abteilung" (Department of Mineralogy-Petrography) was under the directorship of Aristides Brezina.

In 1889, the museum purchased the renowned collection of William Earl Hidden from Newark, New Jersey (USA) for a sum of ƒ15,000 with the aid of an advance from the "All-highest Family Fund" of the Imperial Household. This loan had to be repaid in a series of complicated transactions, effected within a timeframe of ten years (i.e. through the sale of mineral doublets, meteorite sections, and precious-metal redemptions). Unfortunately these redemptions also included samples of silver and gold from the former "Ambrasian Collection" of Archduke Ferdinand II, an irreplaceable loss and impairment to the collection. Despite this, the acquisition of the "Hidden Collection" is of special significance for the Viennese museum. After all, the collection had been considered at that time as the second best private mineral collection in the United States, outranked only by the famous Clarence S. Bement Collection, which was later to be acquired by the American Museum of Natural History in New York.

In the same year of 1889, several items from the former private collection of Crown Prince Rudolf, whose death was reported as suicide, were passed on to the department, although apparently this had been against his will: the Crown Prince had left his natural history collection to Viennese teaching institutions. In accordance with these terms, the geologic and paleontological collection and his mineral collection were to be passed to the "K.k. Hochschule für Bodenkultur" (Imperial-Royal University for Agriculture). Instead, the glass imitations of precious stones and some other mineralogical items were entrusted to the Imperial Natural History Court Museum.

Koechlin became an assistant in 1892 and was promoted to assistant custodian in 1896. In the same year, Friedrich Berwerth was put in charge of the department, taking over from Aristides Brezina, who retired on August 30. Voluntary, unpaid assistance, from 1896 to the end of the monarchy was provided by Felix Karrer, alternately by Anton Pelinka, Hermann Graber, Friedrich Wachter and Karl Hlawatsch. In one last transaction before the collapse of the monarchy, the museum managed to purchase, during the years 1906–1907, the magnificent collection of Staatsrath Freiherr von Braun (totalling more than 2,500 items, doublets not included). There followed the far less important collections of August von Loehr and Rudolf von Görgey, although those were not entirely taken into inventory until after the Second World War, the delay being due to war and subsequent poor economic conditions (the same had happened to the collection of Friedrich Freiherr von Distler, acquired in 1932).

A patron of note at the start of the 20th century was Kommerzialrat Isidor Weinberger. He was one of the great sponsors of mineralogy, and the collection of the Natural History Court Museum is indebted to him for many beautiful specimens. Particularly valuable are the more than 500 meteorite thin sections, formerly owned by Aristides Brezina, custodian and former director, which Weinberger had purchased and later presented to the Museum.

Notes

External links
Website for Naturhistorisches Museum: at www.nhm-wien.ac.at.

Cultural infrastructure completed in 1891
Imperial Natural History Museum
Imperial
Museums established in 1889
1889 establishments in Austria-Hungary